The Iraq Division One is the second-highest division of the Iraqi football league system after the Premier League. The league is contested by 24 clubs. It is operated by the Iraq Football Association (IFA). Each season, the two top-finishing teams in the Division One are automatically promoted to the Premier League. The four lowest-finishing teams in the Division One are relegated to Division Two.

The number of clubs in the league have changed throughout history, most recently in the 2021–22 season when the number of clubs decreased from 28 to 24.

It has previously been called the Division Two but has been known as the Division One since 2003. In the 2021–22 season, Al-Hudood won the title and were promoted alongside runners-up Karbalaa.

List of champions

League structure 

In November 2020, The Iraq FA announced that the number of teams will decrease from 28 to 24 in total starting from 2021-2022 season. To make these changes possible, the Iraq FA announced that in 2020–21 season, The top teams in each group are directly promoted to the Premier League, while 8 teams in total are directly relegated to Division Two.

Current members

2021–22 season

See also
 Iraqi Premier League
 Iraqi Super Cup
 Iraq FA Cup

References

External links
 Iraq Football Association

 
Football leagues in Iraq
Second level football leagues in Asia
Sports leagues established in 1974

sv:Irakiska Division 1